The men's 110 metres hurdles event at the 2005 Asian Athletics Championships was held in Incheon, South Korea on September 1 and 2.

Medalists

Results

Heats
Wind: Heat 1: +0.1 m/s, Heat 2: +0.7 m/s

Final
Wind: 0.0 m/s

References
Results

2005 Asian Athletics Championships
Sprint hurdles at the Asian Athletics Championships